Dumitrița Turner (born 12 February 1964) is a retired Romanian artistic gymnast who won a team silver medal at the 1980 Olympics. She also won a team and an individual gold medal at the 1979 World Championships. After retiring from competition she worked as a coach, first in Onești in Romania, in 1994 in Guatemala, and later in Australia.

References

External links 
 
 
 

Living people
Gymnasts at the 1980 Summer Olympics
Romanian female artistic gymnasts
Olympic gymnasts of Romania
Olympic silver medalists for Romania
World champion gymnasts
Medalists at the World Artistic Gymnastics Championships
1964 births
Olympic medalists in gymnastics
Medalists at the 1980 Summer Olympics
Universiade medalists in gymnastics
Universiade silver medalists for Romania
Universiade bronze medalists for Romania